Choisy is a commune in the eastern French department of Haute-Savoie.

It lies 15 kilometers from Annecy and 35 kilometers from Geneva.

Geography
Located 15 kilometers northwest of Annecy, Choisy belongs to the natural area of "Les Usses". It is situated at an altitude of 390 meters, between a brook to the west, known as "les petites Usses", and Mandallaz Mountain to the east. Approximately 70% of the land is arable and 20% is forested.

Demographics
Since 1975, the rise in population has been continuous, doubling over two decades to reach 1,247 inhabitants by 1993, then 1,675 in 2018. One third of the population is less than 20 years old. The demographic changes are mainly due to the arrival of new inhabitants who work in the Annecy and Geneva areas.

Economy
About thirty artisans and tradesmen work in Choisy, the vast majority belonging to the construction sector. There is no industrial activity. Agriculture remains the dominant activity, with about thirty  dairy farms in operation. The dairy co-op collects 3.5 million liters of milk annually; the milk is used to make Abondance and Emmental cheeses.

See also
Communes of the Haute-Savoie department

References

External links
 Mairie de Choisy website (in French)

Communes of Haute-Savoie